The Chambri language is spoken by the Chambri people of the Chambri Lakes region in the Sepik basin of northern Papua New Guinea. Spellings in the older anthropological literature include Tchambuli, Tshamberi. Being completely surrounded by the Sepik languages, it is geographically separated from the rest of the Ramu–Lower Sepik language family, of which Chambri is a member.

References

External links 
 Paradisec houses a collection of recordings by Bill Foley (WF3) and notebooks from Don Laycock's work (DL2). Both of these collections are open access.

Languages of East Sepik Province
Lower Sepik languages